Jack Taylor (1945 or 1946 – 4 February 2006) was reputedly Britain's fattest man.

Taylor claimed to weigh  (or 317 kg) being 48st when he worked at Morley's using their weighbridge. Also he had to wear specially made trousers of  waist. He became all but a recluse, spending his days simply eating and watching videos, and venturing outside exclusively for hospital appointments. Taylor achieved notoriety in Germany for his eccentric appearance, notably his wig, which he fashioned himself from electrical tape. If anyone asked him about his "hair", he would answer "It's Jack's creation, Jack likes it and it suits him!".

His diet was said to consist of up to 15 tandooris each day. He achieved some notoriety as a result of his size, including appearing on the TV show The Fattest Men in Britain alongside Barry Austin.  In one TV show, Being The Fattest Man, he was weighed at 31 stones (or 196 kg). However, Taylor believed he was much heavier, and this annoyed him greatly; he insisted the scales were faulty.
He died on 4 February 2006 at the age of 60 from a heart attack. Taylor was cremated at Rawdon crematorium in Leeds, which has special facilities to deal with larger coffins.

In 2009 a fictionalized account of his later years in life was made into TV movie called The Fattest Man in Britain.

YouTube footage of the above interview being quoted (3 parts)

1. https://m.youtube.com/watch?v=MdFP6bThkn8&feature=youtu.be 

2. https://m.youtube.com/watch?v=yms7hiezNjE&feature=youtu.be

3. https://m.youtube.com/watch?v=OhhmcAA0vMk&feature=youtu.be

References 

1946 births
2006 deaths